MV Corran is a drive-through ferry built in 2001 and operated across Loch Linnhe on the west coast of Scotland.

History
Built by George Prior Engineering (Yorkshire) Ltd. in Hull, Corran was fitted out in the William Wright Dock in February 2001, and entered service later that year.

Layout
MV Corran has a single car deck with offset bow and stern ramps.

Service
MV Corran has operated the Corran Ferry, across Loch Linnhe since late 2001. She was built for this route, between Ardgour and Corran, allowing Rosehaugh to be retired  after 32 years in service on various routes across the Highlands. Planning for Corrans successor started in 2020.

References

2001 ships
Ships built in Kingston upon Hull
Ferries of Scotland